Chirnside is a rural locality in the Central Highlands Region, Queensland, Australia.

History 
Boundary Provisional School opened on 3 June 1897. On 1 January 1909 it became Boundary State School. In November 1935 it was renamed Chirnside State School. It closed on 1939.

References 

Central Highlands Region
Localities in Queensland